is a Japanese science fiction and fantasy writer.

VIZ Productions is developing a feature film based on her short story "The Street of Fruiting Bodies."

Works in English translation
Novel
 The Cage of Zeus (original title: Zeusu no Ori), trans. Takami Nieda (Haikasoru, 2011)
Short stories
 "Fin and Claw" (original title: Uobune, Kemonobune), trans. Daniel Huddleston (Speculative Japan 3: Silver Bullet and Other Tales of Japanese Science Fiction and Fantasy, Kurodahan Press, 2012)
 "The Street of Fruiting Bodies" (original title: Kusabira no Michi) (Phantasm Japan: Fantasies Light and Dark, From and About Japan, Haikasoru, 2014)

Awards
 2003 – Sakyo Komatsu Award: Kasei Daku Barado (Mars Dark Ballade)
 2011 – Japan SF Award: Karyu no Miya (The Ocean Chronicles)

Bibliography

The Ocean Chronicles series
 Novels
 , 2010
 , 2013
Short stories
  (2006) (English translation: "Fin and Claw")
  (2011)

Pastry series
 , 2005
 , 2008
 , 2011

Yokai Detective series 
 , 2014

Standalone sci-fi/fantasy novels
 , 2003
 , 2004 (English translation: The Cage of Zeus, Haikasoru, 2011)
 , 2008
 , 2012
 , 2015

Short story collections 
 , 2009
   (2006) (English translation: "Fin and Claw")
   (2007) (English translation: "The Street of Fruiting Bodies")
   (2008)
   (2007)
   (2004)
   (2009)
 , 2011
   (2011)
   (2009)
   (2011)
   (2011)

References

External links
 Official website 
 Facebook 
 Twitter account of her agent 
 Interview with Sayuri Ueda, author of The Cage of Zeus (Haikasoru) « The World SF Blog 

1964 births
People from Kobe
20th-century Japanese novelists
21st-century Japanese novelists
Japanese women short story writers
Japanese science fiction writers
Japanese fantasy writers
Living people
Women science fiction and fantasy writers
Japanese women novelists
21st-century Japanese women writers
20th-century Japanese women writers
20th-century Japanese short story writers
21st-century Japanese short story writers